Soyarabai Bhosale (née Mohite) (died 1681) was second wife of Shivaji, the founder of Maratha empire in western India. She was mother of Shivaji's second son, Rajaram. She was the younger sister of Maratha army chief Hambirrao Mohite.

Early life
Born Soyarabai Mohite, she was married to Shivaji at a very young age in 1650. The marriage took place when Shivaji visited his father Shahaji at Bangalore with his mother Jijabai. Tukabai (née Mohite), the stepmother of Shivaji and paternal aunt of Soyarabai insisted on the marriage.

After the death of Jijabai in (1674), Soyarabai gained prominence in Shivaji's family and by extension, in the Maratha court politics. Soyrabai bore two children to Shivaji, a daughter Balibai and son Rajaram.

After Shivaji's death
Contemporaneous Maratha court chronicles such as Parmananda, and from many other documents relate that in initial phases Soyarabai herself was against ministers to perform the coronation to her son Rajaram. Sambhaji is recorded testifyings in contemporary sources that, "the ministers of Shivaji were against him (Sambhaji). They poisoned the mind of Queen Soyarabai by saying that the eldest son of Shivaji (Sambhaji) should not be allowed to inherit the throne". Sambhaji was not kept informed on the Shivaji's death by these ministers or their killedars and he was absent at Raigad when Shivaji was cremated. After Shivaji's death in 1680, with the help of those treacherous courtiers, Soyarabai finally got her son, the ten-year-old prince Rajaram, seated on the vacant throne on 21 April 1680. Her stepson and Shivaji's heir apparent Sambhaji, was able to remove him and Soyarabai from power with the help of Soyrabai's own brother and the Maratha army commander Sarsenapati Hambirrao Mohite. He imprisoned the courtiers opposing him and formally assumed power as the Chhatrapati on 20 July 1680. Soyarabai's henchmen tried to poison Sambhaji in August 1681, but he survived and executed the criminals, installing their sons on their posts instead. 

In a letter dated 27 Oct 1681, written by British Bombay council to Surat, they claim that "Ramrajah's Mother (Soyra Bai) is dead by report, poisoned by Shambhuji Rajah's contrivance " This has been declared a myth by various reputed scholars such as Dr. Sadashiv Shivade and Vasudeo Sitaram Bendrey, as Soyarabai died a year and a half after this date of her alleged murder and was cremated by Chhatrapati Sambhaji himself.

After Sambhaji's death at the hands of the Mughals, Rajaram did become the next Chhatrapati, carrying forward the continuous war of the Marathas against the Mughals.

In Popular Culture

Ayesha Kaduskar portrays a young Soyarabai while Ruchita Jadhav portrays the older Soyarabai in the 2011 series Veer Shivaji
Elakshi Gupta plays Soyrabai in the 2019 Bollywood film Tanhaji
Ruchi Savarn portrays Soyarabai in the 2019 Marathi film Fatteshikast
Shruti Marathe plays Soyarabai in 2022 film, Sarsenapati Hambirrao

References

See also
Shivaji
Chhatrapati Rajaram
Maratha Empire

Executed royalty
Executed Indian women
Indian female royalty
Marathi people
Women of the Maratha Empire
1680 deaths
People executed by poison
17th-century executions in India
Year of birth unknown
17th-century Indian women
17th-century Indian people